Cylarabes, or Cylarabos, or Cylasabos, son of Sthenelus, was a mythological king of Argos.

Mythology 
He succeeded to the throne upon the death of his father. During his reign Argos was finally reunited after having been divided into three parts since the reign of Anaxagoras. Anaxagoras had given one third of his kingdom to Melampus and the other to Bias while Anaxagoras and his line continued to rule the central region. Cylarabes regained the portion of the kingdom given to Bias upon the death of Cyanippus. (The portion belonging to the line of Melampus had been regained by his father Sthenelus, upon the death of Amphilocus). Cylarabes died without an heir and his vacant throne was seized by Orestes, the king of Mycenae.

Notes

References 

 Pausanias, Description of Greece with an English Translation by W.H.S. Jones, Litt.D., and H.A. Ormerod, M.A., in 4 Volumes. Cambridge, MA, Harvard University Press; London, William Heinemann Ltd. 1918. . Online version at the Perseus Digital Library
 Pausanias, Graeciae Descriptio. 3 vols. Leipzig, Teubner. 1903.  Greek text available at the Perseus Digital Library.
 Tripp, Edward, Crowell's Handbook of Classical Mythology, Thomas Y. Crowell Co; First edition (June 1970). .

Kings of Argos
Kings in Greek mythology
Argive characters in Greek mythology